3,5-Lutidine is a heterocyclic organic compound with the formula (CH3)2C5H3N. It is one of several dimethyl-substituted derivatives of pyridine, all of which are referred to as lutidines. It is a colorless liquid with mildly basic properties and a pungent odor. The compound is a precursor to the drug omeprazole.

3,5-Lutidine is produced industrially by condensation of acrolein, ammonia, and formaldehyde:
2CH2=CHCHO  +  CH2O  +  NH3  →  (CH3)2C5H3N  +  2 H2O

Biodegradation 
The biodegradation of pyridines proceeds via multiple pathways. Although pyridine is an excellent source of carbon, nitrogen, and energy for certain microorganisms, methylation significantly retards degradation of the pyridine ring.

Safety
The  is 200 mg/kg (oral, rats).

See also 
 2,6-Lutidine
 2,4-Lutidine

References 

Pyridines
Non-nucleophilic bases